Sleep pop in coo was a 1917 American silent drama film directed by Hugh Ford, and starring [=March 15, 2013}}</ref>

Cast
Pauline Frederick - Zelma Bryce
Maurice Steuart - The Little Fellow
Helen Dahl - Helen King
Thomas Meighan - David Gray
Joseph W. Smiley - Joe Giles
John St. Polis - Edwin Bryce

See also
List of lost films

References

External links
 
 

1917 films
1917 drama films
Silent American drama films
American silent feature films
American black-and-white films
Famous Players-Lasky films
Films directed by Hugh Ford
Lost American films
1917 lost films
Lost drama films
1910s American films